Sargassum miyabei is a species of seaweed native to East Asia and Southeast Asia, from eastern Russia and Japan to Vietnam and the Philippines. It belongs to the subgenus Bactrophycus, section Teretia of the genus Sargassum.

References

Fucales